Cody Dion Brown (born November 9, 1986) is a former American football linebacker. He was drafted by the Arizona Cardinals in the second round of the 2009 NFL Draft. He played college football at Connecticut.

He was also a member of the Detroit Lions, New York Jets & Calgary Stampeders.

Early years
Brown attended Coral Springs High School, where he made 88 tackles and had nine quarterback sacks as a senior. He was named first-team All-Broward County and honorable mention All-State.

Considered a two-star recruit by Rivals.com, Brown was not ranked among the best defensive end prospects in the nation.

College career
Cody Brown was a three-year starter at defensive end and a team captain for the Huskies during his senior season. In 2005, he became the first true freshman lineman to start a game after Connecticut's upgrade to NCAA Football Bowl Subdivision. He was named starter for the Huskies during his sophomore season, and has since started every game in which he participated. In his final two seasons as a Husky, Brown registered a total of 18.5 sacks and 33 tackles for loss and he was named to the First-team All-Big East at defensive end after his senior season.

Professional career

Pre-draft

Arizona Cardinals
Picked 63rd overall by the Arizona Cardinals, Brown was the last of four former Huskies to be taken from in the first two rounds of the 2009 NFL Draft. The Cardinals selection of Brown, together with the New England Patriots and New York Giants respective second round draft picks, Darius Butler and William Beatty, and first round Indianapolis Colts selection Donald Brown, established a UConn football presence in the NFL draft; by the end of the second round, the only school that exceeded UConn's four picks—by one pick—was USC. Brown suffered a wrist injury during the 2009 preseason and was placed on season-ending injured reserve on August 24. Brown would be waived by the team on September 3, 2010.

New York Jets
The New York Jets signed Brown to their practice squad on September 7, 2010. Brown was signed to a future contract on January 25, 2011. He was waived on August 7.

Detroit Lions
On August 8, 2011, the Detroit Lions claimed him off waivers.

Calgary Stampeders
Brown signed with the Calgary Stampeders of the Canadian Football League in February 2012, but was released in training camp, prior to the 2012 CFL season.

Montreal Alouettes
Brown signed with the Montreal Alouettes of the Canadian Football League on May 13, 2012.

References

External links
Arizona Cardinals bio
UConn Huskies bio

1986 births
Living people
Players of American football from Florida
American football defensive ends
American football linebackers
UConn Huskies football players
Arizona Cardinals players
New York Jets players
Detroit Lions players
Sportspeople from Coral Springs, Florida
Coral Springs High School alumni